Bernard J. Crehan, Irish priest and writer, was born on 2 July 1874.

Crehan was born in Rushestown, County Galway to John Crehan and Mary Farrell. He was ordained a Roman Catholic priest in 1900.

While stationed in County Sligo in the early 1900s, he became involved in the Irish cultural revival, and published works which sought to promote the Irish language.

He served at various times as President of the County Sligo Gaelic League, President of Grange Feis, and Hon. General Secretary to the Connaught Irish Colleges. He was a member of Sligo Feis Ceoil Committee, An Coisde Gnotha, the Irish Texts Society.

See also
 Maol Eoin Ó Crechain, died 1243.

Select bibliography
 Comhradh le haghaidh mac-Cughinn, 1903
 Leabhar urnaighte Naomh Padraic, 1905
 Mion-Chaint. Gill's Irish phrase book, n.d.

References
 Galway Authors, Helen Mahar, 1976

Irish writers
People from County Galway